This is a list of museums in New York City, which is home to hundreds of cultural institutions and historic sites, many of which are internationally known. Also included are non-profit art galleries, arts centers, and cultural centers with galleries.

 See also List of museums and cultural institutions in New York City for museums and other visitor attractions including zoos and gardens, performing arts organizations, libraries, and historically-significant sites.
 See also List of museums in New York (state) for museums in the rest of New York state.

Museums

Defunct museums
 9/11 Tribute Museum
 AIGA National Design Center
American Museum of Immigration, Liberty Island
Art in General
 Barnum's American Museum, Manhattan
 Chelsea Art Museum, Manhattan, closed in 2011
Children's Museum of the Arts
 Con Edison Energy Museum, Manhattan
Choco-Story New York
Dahesh Museum of Art, Exhibits art from its collection at other museums
 Discovery Times Square, closed in 2016
 Enrico Caruso Museum of America
Fisher Landau Center
 Forbes Galleries, closed in 2014
 FusionArts Museum
 Guggenheim Soho, Manhattan
 Kurdish Library and Museum, Brooklyn
Met Breuer, Manhattan, closed July 2020
 MICRO Museum, Brooklyn
 Morbid Anatomy Museum, Brooklyn, closed in 2016
 Museum of Biblical Art, closed in 2015
 Museum of Comic and Cartoon Art, closed in 2012, collections now part of the Society of Illustrators
 Museum of Living Art, 1927-1943 at NYU, modern art collection of Albert Eugene Gallatin
 Museum of Primitive Art, closed in 1976, collections now part of the Metropolitan Museum of Art
 Museum of the American Piano, Manhattan, website
 National Museum of Catholic Art and History, closed in 2010
 New York Jazz Museum in Manhattan
 New York City Police Museum
 New York Tattoo Museum in Staten Island
 Proteus Gowanus, Brooklyn, closed in 2015
 Ripley's Believe It or Not!, midtown Manhattan, 2007-2021
 Rock and Roll Hall of Fame Annex, opened in SoHo in 2008, closed in 2010
 Rosè Mansion 
 Sony Wonder Technology Lab, closed in 2016
 Sports Museum of America, Manhattan, opened in 2008, closed in 2009
 Store Front Museum, Queens
 UBS Art Gallery, Manhattan

See also 
 List of museums in New York
 Museum Mile, New York City
 :Category:Tourist attractions in New York City

References

External links 
 NY.com: Museums in New York City
 NY Go: Free NYC Museums

 Museums
New York City museums
Museums
New York City museums